Khakrez District is a rural agrarian community with a population of more than 20,000 located in north-central Kandahar Province. A village known variously as Khakrez or Darvishan, at the base of mountains in the western part of the district, is the location of the district center building and the Shah Agha Shrine or Shah Maqsud Shrine, one of the oldest historical Islamic sites in Afghanistan.

The district borders Ghorak District to the west, Maywand and Zhari districts to the south, Arghandab and Shah Wali Kot districts to the east and Naish District to the north. Before Zhari District was created in 2004, it bordered Panjwai District.

References

External links
AIMS District Map

Districts of Kandahar Province